Firmino da Silveira Soares Filho (16 December 1963 – 6 April 2021) was a Brazilian economist and politician. A member of the Brazilian Social Democracy Party, he served as Mayor of Teresina from 1997 to 2004 and again from 2013 to 2020. With three terms, he matched the amount of his predecessor, . He also served on the Legislative Assembly of Piauí.

Biography
Filho graduated from the Federal University of Pernambuco with a degree in economics. He earned his master's degree from the University of Illinois. Subsequently, he worked for the Tribunal de Contas da União and as a professor for the Federal University of Piauí.

Filho began his political career at the age of 30 in 1993, when he was appointed by Mayor of Teresina Raimundo Wall Ferraz to become Municipal Secretary of Finance. After the Mayor's death on 22 March 1995, Filho kept his administrative position under the leadership of Francisco Gerardo.

A member of the Brazilian Social Democracy Party, Filho was elected Mayor of Teresina in 1996, defeating  of the Brazilian Democratic Movement in the second round. Filho was one of the youngest mayors in Brazil and defeated his previous opponent's son, Marcos Silva in 2000.

Filho was heavily concerned with development of Teresina's working class residents. He introduced the Vila-Bairro project, which greatly improved quality of life on the outskirts of the city. It was recognized as a great success by Caixa Econômica Federal, which recommended the practice to the United Nations in a 2000 conference in China. As a result of this development, he received awards from the United Nations Human Settlements Programme, the Ford Foundation, the Fundação Getulio Vargas, the Brazilian Development Bank, and others.

In 2006, two years after he left the post of Mayor, Filho ran for Governor of Piauí, where he was defeated by incumbent Governor Wellington Dias. In 2008, he was elected to serve on the Municipal Council of Teresina, achieving the second highest vote total for Teresina Municipal Council history, behind only  in 1972.

Filho was elected to the Legislative Assembly of Piauí after earning 47,634 votes. In 2012, he defeated Wellington Dias in the first round and Elmano Férrer in the second, and once again assumed the office of Mayor of Teresina.

On 6 April 2021, Firmino Filho was found dead in Teresina, where he reportedly fell from the 14th floor of the Manhattan River Center, the location of his office with the Tribunal de Contas da União.

References

1963 births
2021 deaths
Brazilian economists
Members of the Legislative Assembly of Piauí
Mayors of places in Brazil
Brazilian Social Democracy Party politicians
Federal University of Pernambuco alumni
University of Illinois alumni
People from Teresina